Federal Agent at Large is a 1950 American crime film directed by George Blair, written by Albert DeMond and starring Dorothy Patrick, Robert Rockwell, Kent Taylor, Estelita Rodriguez, Thurston Hall and Frank Puglia. The film was released on March 12, 1950 by Republic Pictures.

Plot

Cast    
Dorothy Patrick as Solitare
Robert Rockwell as Dr. Ross Carrington
Kent Taylor as Mark Reed, aka Nick Ravel
Estelita Rodriguez as Lopita
Thurston Hall as 'Big Bill' Dixon
Frank Puglia as Angelo 'Angel' Badillo
Roy Barcroft as Nels Berger
Denver Pyle as 'Jumpy' Jordan
Jonathan Hale as James Goodwin
Robert Kent as Harry Monahan
Kenneth MacDonald as Captain
Sonia Darrin as Mildred
Frank McFarland as Duke Warren 
John McGuire as Customs officer

References

External links
 

1950 films
American crime films
1950 crime films
Republic Pictures films
Films directed by George Blair
American black-and-white films
1950s English-language films
1950s American films